{{Infobox person
| name = Jun Nagura
| native_name = 名倉 潤
| native_name_lang = ja
| birth_date = 
| birth_place = Himeji, Hyōgo, Japan
| nationality = Japanese
| other_names = 
| occupation = 
| years_active = 1986–present
| agent = Watanabe Entertainment
| height = 1.7 m
| television = {{hlist|Shin Kankaku Game: Questa|Egura Kaiun-dō|Honne no Dendō!! Shinsuke ni hawa karumai}}
| spouse = 
| partner = 
|footnotes= Same year/generation as:'''Ameagari KesshitaiGokuraku Tombo
}}
 is a Japanese comedian, actor and businessman who is the leader of the comedy trio Neptune and in charge of tsukkomi''.

Nagura is represented with Watanabe Entertainment. His wife is Marina Watanabe. Nagura is left-handed. He is the father of two children, one boy and one girl. Nagura is the youngest out of four male brothers.

Filmography
These lists below only feature Nagura as an individual.

To see him as part of the comedy trio, see Neptune (owarai).

Current appearances

Irregular appearances

Former appearances

One-off

TV drama

Advertisements

References

Japanese comedians
Japanese television presenters
People from Hyōgo Prefecture
1968 births
Living people